Antonio José González García (born 27 November 1981), commonly known as Curro, is a Spanish footballer who plays for Don Benito as a midfielder.

Club career
Born in Santa Amalia, Badajoz, Extremadura, Curro represented CF Extremadura as a youth. After spending several years with the reserves, he made his first team debut on 10 October 2001, coming on as an extra-time substitute for goalscorer Pedro José in a 1–1 Copa del Rey home draw against CD Badajoz (2–4 loss on penalties).

Curro left the club in 2002, and subsequently joined CD Don Benito in Tercera División. He continued to appear in the category but also in Segunda División B in the following years, representing Elche CF Ilicitano, CD Santa Amalia, CD Díter Zafra, UD Las Palmas, CD Villanueva, Real Oviedo, Cultural Leonesa, Badajoz and Extremadura UD.

References

External links

1981 births
Living people
People from Las Vegas Altas
Sportspeople from the Province of Badajoz
Spanish footballers
Footballers from Extremadura
Association football midfielders
Segunda División B players
Tercera División players
CF Extremadura footballers
Elche CF Ilicitano footballers
UD Las Palmas players
Real Oviedo players
Cultural Leonesa footballers
CD Badajoz players